Nat Bartsch is a pianist and composer based in Melbourne, Australia who creates lyrical, meditative work that explores the space between classical and jazz genres.

Career

Early years 
She began classical piano lessons from the age of 4, and following high school she completed a Diploma of Music Performance at Box Hill Institute, where she began to discover the world of jazz and contemporary playing. Bartsch grew up listening to Radiohead, Sigur Ros and Elbow. later discovering artists like Tord Gustavsen, Nik Bärtsch, Marcin Wasilewski Trio and Arvo Pärt. In 2006 Bartsch completed a Bachelor of Music Performance (improvisation) at the Victorian College of the Arts. Upon graduation she was awarded the inaugural Lionel Gell Foundation Travelling Scholarship.

2010-2013: Nat Bartsch Trio 
Bartsch's career began as bandleader/composer for the jazz ensemble Nat Bartsch Trio, influenced by Scandinavian and Australian jazz, and studies with Tord Gustavsen and Nik Bärtsch. They released their Springs, for all the Winters album on Rufus/ABC Jazz in 2010, and To Sail, To Sing independently in 2013. Her trio toured Japan twice, and performed in Europe supporting Abdullah Ibrahim's Ekaya in 2013.

2014-present: Solo career 
In 2014 Bartsch shifted away from jazz and focused on the creation of solo piano and chamber music works, drawing more upon neoclassical and neo-romantic influences. A developing friendship/collaboration with fellow pianist Luke Howard led to the creation of her debut solo album Hometime in 2017.

Bartsch has become most well known for her lullabies, which, during early motherhood, saw her translate her gentle aesthetic into music with purpose. She created a suite of pieces designed to soothe babies to sleep (influenced by music therapy), but that would also be meaningfully enjoyable for adults. The resulting album, Forever, and No Time At All was released in 2018 on ABC Classic, with a jazz sextet re-interpretation, Forever More, released in 2020.

In 2021 she released her fourth solo album Hope. Bartsch said the title "abbreviates both hopefulness and hopelessness".

Bartsch has composed chamber music commissions for Plexus Collective, Solstice Trio, Matt Withers/Sally Whitwell and The Muses Trio. She was the recipient of the 2020 Catherine Mary Sullivan scholarship, 2020 Classical:NEXT Artistic Associate Fellowship, 2019 Johnny Dennis Music Award, 2010 Melbourne Prize for Music Development Award and the 2007 Lionel Gell Travelling Fellowship. She has also performed with artists in many contemporary genres as a pianist/keyboardist, including Whitaker, Thando, Timothy Coghill, Sweet Jean, Matt Corby and Circus Oz.

Discography

Albums

Awards and nominations

AIR Awards
The Australian Independent Record Awards (commonly known informally as AIR Awards) is an annual awards night to recognise, promote and celebrate the success of Australia's Independent Music sector.

! 
|-
| 2022
| Hope
| Best Independent Classical Album or EP
| 
|

ARIA Awards 
The ARIA Music Awards are presented annually since 1987 by the Australian Recording Industry Association (ARIA).

! 
|-
| 2020 ARIA Music Awards || Forever More || ARIA Award for Best Jazz Album ||  || | 
|-
| 2021 ARIA Music Awards || Hope || ARIA Award for Best Classical Album || 
|-

Music Victoria Awards
The Music Victoria Awards are an annual awards night celebrating Victorian music. They commenced in 2006.

! 
|-
| 2021
| Nat Bartsch
| Arts Access Amplify Award (for Deaf and Disabled acts)
| 
| 
|-
| 2022
| Nat Bartsch
| Arts Access Amplify Award
| 
| 
|-

References

External links 

 

Australian composers
Australian pianists
Living people
Year of birth missing (living people)